Nándor Károly Tamás (born 24 October 2000) is a Romanian professional footballer who plays as a forward for Nemzeti Bajnokság II side Csákvár on loan from Puskás Akadémia.

Club career
He made his NB I debut playing for Puskás Akadémia in a 3-0 home win against Fehérvár on 3 February 2019.

International career
Nándor Tamás played four games and scored one goal for Romania's under 18 team in 2017 under the guidance of coach Florin Bratu.

Personal life 
He is of Hungarian ethnicity.

Career statistics

Club

References

2000 births
Living people
People from Târgu Secuiesc
Romanian footballers
Romania youth international footballers
Association football midfielders
Csákvári TK players
Puskás Akadémia FC players
Puskás Akadémia FC II players
Nemzeti Bajnokság I players
Nemzeti Bajnokság III players
Liga I players
Sepsi OSK Sfântu Gheorghe players
Romanian expatriate footballers
Expatriate footballers in Hungary
Romanian expatriate sportspeople in Hungary
Romanian people of Hungarian descent
Romanian sportspeople of Hungarian descent